Ihor Maliar (born 5 August 1971) is a Ukrainian former pair skater. He began competing with Olena Bilousivska in 1993. They placed ninth at the 1994 European Championships and were selected to represent Ukraine at the 1994 Winter Olympics, finishing 16th in Lillehammer. Maliar then teamed up with Lilia Mashkovskaya. The pair placed 13th at the 1995 European Championships.

Competitive highlights

With Mashkovskaya

With Bilousivska

References 

1971 births
Ukrainian male pair skaters
Living people
Figure skaters at the 1994 Winter Olympics
Olympic figure skaters of Ukraine